Heterotoma merioptera is a species of bugs from Miridae family. It is a small slender dark plant bug. The second antennal segment is broad and flattened. The legs are light green.  Heterotoma merioptera is very similar to Heterotoma planicornis and the name may be a synonym.

References

Insects described in 1763
Orthotylini
Taxa named by Giovanni Antonio Scopoli